Anand Aur Anand is a 1984 Indian film, which is most famous for being the debut movie of both Dev Anand's son, Suneil Anand as well as Natasha Sinha and famous playback singer Abhijeet Bhattacharya. It stars Dev Anand along with Suneil Anand, Natasha Sinha, Raakhee, Smita Patil, Raj Babbar, and Biswajit Chatterjee.

Plot
Arun Anand (Dev Anand) has been married for several years now, but his wife (Raakhee) is unable to conceive. Arun has an affair with his personal secretary, Kiran (Smita Patil), and as a result Kiran gets pregnant. Arun does not want a scandal to upset his wife, so he asks an impotent union leader, Pratap Singh (Raj Babbar), to marry Kiran, sire the child, and then divorce her, all for a hefty sum of money. Pratap agrees to this arrangement, and soon a boy is born. Pratap then changes his mind about divorcing Kiran, as her son is proof of his virility and manhood, and as such disappears from Arun's life. Years later Kiran's son has grown up and named Varun Singh (Suneil Anand). Arun finally finds out about them and meets them, but is rejected by Varun, who has come to accept Pratap as his father. There is a confrontation between Pratap and his employer, Thakur (Biswajit Chatterjee), and as a result, Varun is abducted, tied to a tree with four wild elephants who are made to drink alcohol, and after which will go on a drunken and virtually unstoppable rampage - starting with the gory death of the person nearest to them - Varun.

Cast
Dev Anand as Arun Anand
Suneil Anand as Varun Singh
Raj Babbar as Pratap Singh, Union Leader
Rakhee Gulzar as Mrs. Arun Anand
Smita Patil as Kiran
 Natasha Sinha as Rachna Thakur, Varun's girlfriend
Rakesh Bedi as Ravi
 Biswajit Chatterjee as Thakur

Crew
Director: Dev Anand
Producer: Dev Anand
Story: Suraj Sanim
Cinematographer: D. K. Prabhakar

Soundtrack

References

External links

1984 films
1980s Hindi-language films
Films directed by Dev Anand
Films scored by R. D. Burman